Whangaruru is a rural community and harbour on the east coast of Northland, New Zealand. Mokau, Helena Bay, Whakapara, Hikurangi and Whangarei are to the south and the Bay of Islands is to the northwest.

The Whangaruru area includes the villages of Punaruku west of the harbour, Whangaruru north of the harbour, and Whangaruru North east of the harbour.

The area was reputedly named by Puhimoanariki who was sailing up the coast. After searching for a long time he found shelter from bad weather there. The name "Whangaruru" is a Māori-language word meaning "sheltered harbour", and is a direct linguistic cognate with "Honolulu" in the related Hawaiian language.

Marae

The Ngātiwai hapū of Te Uri o Hikihiki are the indigenous people of Whangaruru.

The hapū has several traditional meeting grounds in the Whangaruru and Panaruku area, including the Ngātiwai Marae and Ngāti Wai Soldiers' Memorial Hall, the Ōtetao Reti Marae and Hoori Reti meeting house, and the Tuparehuia Marae.

In October 2020, the Government committed $444,239 from the Provincial Growth Fund to upgrade Ōtetao Reti Marae, creating 33 jobs. It also committed $295,095 to upgrade Ngātiwai Marae, creating 5 jobs.

Demographics
Statistics New Zealand describes Ōakura-Whangaruru South as a rural settlement. The settlement is part of the larger Whangaruru statistical area.

Ōakura-Whangaruru South had a population of 150 at the 2018 New Zealand census, an increase of 39 people (35.1%) since the 2013 census, and a decrease of 9 people (−5.7%) since the 2006 census. There were 66 households, comprising 81 males and 69 females, giving a sex ratio of 1.17 males per female. The median age was 60.4 years (compared with 37.4 years nationally), with 15 people (10.0%) aged under 15 years, 18 (12.0%) aged 15 to 29, 60 (40.0%) aged 30 to 64, and 57 (38.0%) aged 65 or older.

Ethnicities were 76.0% European/Pākehā, 30.0% Māori, 8.0% Pacific peoples, and 2.0% Asian. People may identify with more than one ethnicity.

Although some people chose not to answer the census's question about religious affiliation, 34.0% had no religion, 44.0% were Christian and 4.0% had other religions.

Of those at least 15 years old, 27 (20.0%) people had a bachelor's or higher degree, and 33 (24.4%) people had no formal qualifications. The median income was $21,100, compared with $31,800 nationally. 9 people (6.7%) earned over $70,000 compared to 17.2% nationally. The employment status of those at least 15 was that 33 (24.4%) people were employed full-time, 12 (8.9%) were part-time, and 3 (2.2%) were unemployed.

Whangaruru statistical area

Whangaruru statistical area had a population of 2,520 at the 2018 New Zealand census, an increase of 420 people (20.0%) since the 2013 census, and an increase of 453 people (21.9%) since the 2006 census. There were 858 households, comprising 1,323 males and 1,197 females, giving a sex ratio of 1.11 males per female. The median age was 44.1 years (compared with 37.4 years nationally), with 525 people (20.8%) aged under 15 years, 396 (15.7%) aged 15 to 29, 1,170 (46.4%) aged 30 to 64, and 432 (17.1%) aged 65 or older.

Ethnicities were 77.1% European/Pākehā, 35.7% Māori, 3.2% Pacific peoples, 1.1% Asian, and 1.5% other ethnicities. People may identify with more than one ethnicity.

The percentage of people born overseas was 10.5, compared with 27.1% nationally.

Although some people chose not to answer the census's question about religious affiliation, 54.6% had no religion, 33.6% were Christian, 1.3% had Māori religious beliefs, 0.1% were Hindu, 0.1% were Muslim, 0.1% were Buddhist and 1.7% had other religions.

Of those at least 15 years old, 267 (13.4%) people had a bachelor's or higher degree, and 426 (21.4%) people had no formal qualifications. The median income was $24,300, compared with $31,800 nationally. 210 people (10.5%) earned over $70,000 compared to 17.2% nationally. The employment status of those at least 15 was that 867 (43.5%) people were employed full-time, 306 (15.3%) were part-time, and 132 (6.6%) were unemployed.

Education

Whangaruru School is a coeducational full primary (years 1-8) school with a roll of   students as of  The school was founded in 2005 to replace Punaruku, Ngaiotonga Valley and Helena Bay Schools. It is on the site of the old Punaruku School.

Te Kura Hourua ki Whangaruru was a secondary (years 9-13) partnership school opened in 2014, and closed in 2016.

External links

Whangarei District Council Description

Notes

Whangarei District
Populated places in the Northland Region
Ports and harbours of New Zealand